Aechmea guainumbiorum is a species of flowering plant in the genus Aechmea. This species is endemic to the State of Pernambuco in eastern Brazil.

References

guainumbiorum
Flora of Brazil
Plants described in 2007